Eucraera is a genus of moths in the family Lasiocampidae. The genus was first described by Tams in 1930.

Species
Eucraera aphrasta Tams, 1936
Eucraera decora (Fawcett, 1915)
Eucraera gemmata (Distant, 1897) 
Eucraera koellikerii (Dewitz, 1881) 
Eucraera magna (Aurivillius, 1909)
Eucraera minor (Gaede, 1915) 
Eucraera salammbo (Vuillot, 1892)

References

Lasiocampidae